Leona Wachtstetter (born May 1928), nicknamed Mama Lee, is an American author and long-term passenger on cruise ships.  Wachtstetter worked as a registered nurse, while her husband, Mason Wachtstetter, performed real estate appraisals and worked as a banker. The couple went on their first cruise in 1962 and went on 89 cruises together in total. Mason, who died in 1997, told Leona the day before his death to continue traveling on cruise ships. She initially traveled many times on cruise ships with a friend before becoming a solo traveler. Wachtstetter began living on the Holland America Line cruise ship MS Prinsendam in 2005.

Wachtstetter, who spends hours dancing on cruise ships, moved in 2008 to living full-time on the Crystal Serenity after Prinsendam stopped providing trained dance partners. It cost her US$164,000 in 2015 to live on the Crystal Serenity. In 2017, she published the book I May Be Homeless, But You Should See My Yacht detailing her life on Crystal Serenity for a decade.

Early and personal life
Leona Wachtstetter was born in May 1928 to Agnes and Joseph W. Davis, a dental surgeon. Her younger brother, Richard, was born in 1936, and the family lived in Freeport, a village on Long Island. She frequently enjoyed accompanying her parents on their cabin cruiser, a  boat with six beds that they routinely used during weekends including going to Jones Beach Island. Wachtstetter took summer school classes immediately after her high school junior year. After completing the classes, Wachtstetter had sufficient credits to immediately be done with high school. With her mother encouraging her to begin university, she did not return to high school so did not attend her senior prom or high school graduation. Wachtstetter enrolled in Adelphi College's pre-nursing curriculum. After her father had an unsuccessful eye surgery, he needed to resign from his dentist job. Her father, mother, and brother relocated to Hollywood, Florida. Wachtstetter continued attending classes at Adelphi but several months later, her father asked her to join them and she visited Hollywood during the Easter break in 1946 for two weeks. She returned to Adelphi, where she completed her spring semester before moving to Florida to enroll in the School of Nursing at University of Miami's Jackson Memorial Hospital. She met her husband, Mason Wachtstetter, on a beach in Hollywood.

Her husband did real estate appraisals and worked as a banker, while she was a registered nurse at South Broward Hospital and Clinic. They lived in a five-bedroom, 10-acre Fort Lauderdale, Florida, house. She went on her first cruise with her husband in 1962 on P&O's cruise ship SS Florida that traveled from Miami to Nassau, Bahamas. Her husband cofounded the Hollywood Playhouse, and in the 1960s, she performed in plays including A Majority of One in 1966 and the comedy Dear Me, the Sky is Falling in 1967. She and her husband went on a three-week cruise and upon returning chose to have him retire in 1976 from Home Federal Savings and Loan Association, where he had been vice president. They were married for 50 years until he died on September 25, 1997, from cancer at age 76. The Wachtstetters went on 89 cruises together. While she was a dancing enthusiast, her husband did not enjoy dancing, so he told her to ask cruise ship dance hosts to dance with her. The couple had four children (three sons and a daughter), who accompanied them on numerous cruises, and seven grandchildren. Her daughter died of cancer in December 2011. In the early 21st century, Lee underwent cataract surgery.

Living on cruise ships
Wachtstetter's husband advised her, "Don't stop cruising," the day before his death. Following his advice, Wachtstetter initially traveled numerous times on cruise ships with a friend before boarding ships as a solo traveler. A friend maintained the house while she was away for as much as 11 months in the year. After her daughter proposed that she do so, Wachtstetter sold the house along with her car and nearly all her possessions. In 2008, the friend who was maintaining the house purchased it from Wachtstetter.

Beginning in 2005 when Wachtstetter was 76, she lived on the Holland America Line cruise ship MS Prinsendam. Wachtstetter is a dancing enthusiast. After Prinsendam stopped providing trained dance partners, she moved in 2008 to living full-time on the Crystal Serenity. Crystal Serenity has 13 decks and 535 rooms and accommodates 1,070 passengers and 655 crew. Wachtstetter liked that Crystal Serenity provided dance partners. Each evening, she spends two hours dancing on the ship's Palm Court lounge while the Crystal Sextet band performs music. Multiple times every week, the ship's dancing teachers give her and other passengers free lessons. In a sign of deep respect for her based on their customs, the Filipino crew gave her the nickname Mama Lee.

She funds her cruises and lifestyle through assets her late husband left to her. Wachtstetter eats both meals that were included in the base price and upcharge options. During dinner, she meets people while seated at an eight-person table. After going on cruises, she gained  and attempted to lose weight through maintaining a liquid diet consisting of fruits and vegetables for four months. For entertainment, she attends performances, lectures, the captain's cocktail celebrations, and film showings, and ballroom dancing every night with dance partners provided by the cruise line. She needlepoints for a substantial amount of time on the ship's Palm Court lounge, and gifts the embroidered work to the ship's staff. Items she makes for the staff include toys, tablecloths, and handbags.

Wachtstetter seldom leaves the ship when it docks since she probably previously has been to the ports, but when the ship docks at Istanbul, she visits the Grand Bazaar, which offers a lot of fancy clothing that she likes. While cruising, Wachtstetter uses her laptop to remain in contact with her children and grandchildren, one of whom she reportedly speaks with every day. Her family joins her for dinners when the ship docks in Miami. Wachtstetter visits her family whenever her cruise ship stops in Miami, which happens around five times per year. Every year during Christmas, she spends several weeks on land with her children and grandchildren. She views it as a good opportunity not to be on the ship, as numerous guests are often children.

Wachtstetter wrote a book about her experience living on Crystal Serenity titled I May Be Homeless, But You Should See My Yacht. Published in 2017, the book discusses her decision to sell her large house after her husband's death and become a full-time cruise ship resident rather than relocating to an assisted living facility. CNN said her memoir describes "her cruising shenanigans" such as a Thailand auto rickshaw driver's kidnap of her and her encountering a Mediterranean "rogue wave". CNBC called the book "a much-read memoir".

Before becoming a long-term passenger on Crystal Serenity, Wachtstetter had been on about 200 cruises. By January 2016, she had been on the ship for seven and a half years, which amounted to 215 cruises.

Works

References

1928 births
21st-century American dancers
21st-century American women writers
Adelphi University alumni
American women memoirists
American women nurses
Living people
People from Fort Lauderdale, Florida
People from Freeport, New York
Writers from Fort Lauderdale, Florida
University of Miami alumni